The Darjah Utama Bakti Cemerlang (Tentera) is a decoration awarded to members of the Singapore Armed Forces and allied military members for exceptionally distinguished service or merit in senior command or staff positions.

The medal of the Darjah Utama Bakti Cemerlang (Tentera) is worn  on a sash with breast star included.
Recipients are entitled to use the post-nominal letters DUBC.

The Darjah Utama Bakti Cemerlang is the civil equivalent award.

Description

 The ribbon is purple with red and white edge stripes.

Recipients 
Australia
General John Baker – Chief of Defence Force
2002 – Admiral Chris Barrie – Chief of Defence Force
2004 – General Sir Peter Cosgrove – Chief of Defence Force
2007 – Air Chief Marshal Sir Angus Houston – Chief of Defence Force
2013 – General David Hurley – Chief of Defence Force
2017 – Dennis Richardson – Secretary of the Department of Defence
2017 – Air Chief Marshal Mark Binskin – Chief of Defence Force
2022 – General Angus Campbell – Chief of Defence Force

Brunei
2004 – Major General Halbi Mohd Yussof – Commander of Royal Brunei Armed Forces
2011 – Colonel Yasmin Umar – Deputy Minister of Defence
2012 – Major General Aminuddin Ihsan – Commander of Royal Brunei Armed Forces
2015 – Major General Mohammad Tawih – Commander of Royal Brunei Armed Forces
2019 – Major General Aminan Mahmud – Commander of Royal Brunei Armed Forces

Indonesia
1991 – General Try Sutrisno – Commander-in-Chief of the Indonesian National Defence Forces
1995 – General Feisal Tanjung – Commander-in-Chief of the Indonesian National Defence Forces
1999 – General Wiranto – Commander-in-Chief of the Indonesian National Defence Forces
2004 – General Endriartono Sutarto – Commander-in-Chief of the Indonesian National Defence Forces
2007 – Air Chief Marshal Djoko Suyanto – Commander-in-Chief of the Indonesian National Defence Forces
2009 – General Djoko Santoso – Commander-in-Chief of the Indonesian National Defence Forces
2012 – Admiral Agus Suhartono – Commander-in-Chief of the Indonesian National Defence Forces
2015 – General Moeldoko – Commander-in-Chief of the Indonesian National Defence Forces
2018 – General Gatot Nurmantyo – Commander-in-Chief of the Indonesian National Defence Forces
2021 – Air Chief Marshal Hadi Tjahjanto – Commander-in-Chief of the Indonesian National Defence Forces

Malaysia
2018 – General Raja Mohamed Affandi Raja Mohamed Noor – Malaysia Chief of Defence Force
2022 - General Affendi Buang - Chief of the Malaysian Armed Forces

New Zealand
2006 – Air Marshal Sir Bruce Ferguson – New Zealand Chief of Defence Force
2011 – Lieutenant General Sir Jerry Mateparae – New Zealand Chief of Defence Force and Governor-General of New Zealand

Thailand
General Sunthorn Kongsompong – Supreme Commander of the Royal Thai Armed Forces
2003 – General Surayud Chulanont – Supreme Commander of the Royal Thai Armed Forces
2005 – General Chaiyasit Shinawatra – Supreme Commander of the Royal Thai Armed Forces
2015 – General Worapong Sanganetra – Chief of Defence Forces of the Royal Thai Armed Forces
2016 – General Sommai Kaotira – Chief of Defence Forces of the Royal Thai Armed Forces
2017 – General Surapong Suwana-adth – Chief of Defence Forces of the Royal Thai Armed Forces
2018 – General Thanchaiyan Srisuwan – Chief of Defence Forces of the Royal Thai Armed Forces
United States
2005 – Air Force General Richard Myers – Chairman of the Joint Chiefs of Staff of the Military of the United States
2017 – Marine Corps General Joe Dunford – Chairman of the Joint Chiefs of Staff of the Military of the United States

References

1981 establishments in Singapore
Military awards and decorations of Singapore